S. darwinii may refer to:

Sapphirina darwinii, a species of parasitic copepod
Senecio darwinii, a plant species

See also
 S. darwini (disambiguation)
 Darwinii (disambiguation)